Ales Prudnikau (April 14, 1910 – August 5, 1941) was a Belarusian poet. He was a cousin of another Belarusian writer, Pavel Prudnikau.

Biography

Ales Prudnikau was born into a peasant family. His father Traphim was called to the front at the time of World War I, he was badly injured and died soon after. Because of the unstable situation Ales couldn't find a constant place tor study for a long time. In 1924-1930 he was studying in the seven-years school in the village Miloslavicy. In 1930 he worked on the building of the railway Asipovichy - Mahilyow - Roslavl, then in 1931 he worked in Minsk (in editory, in Belarusin Telegraph Agency). In 1932-1933 he was studying at the creative department of the Minsk pedagogical institute. In March 1933 he was arrested but after eight months was liberated and was called up to the Red Army, where he served until 1935. In 1935-1936 he worked on the local Klimovichy newspaper "Kamuna". In 1938 he graduated from the Leningrad pedagogical institute. He worked as the teacher, then as inspector of the Petrovo (now Kondopoga) raion of Karelian ASSR (in 1940-1956 - the Karelo-Finnish Soviet Socialist Republic), at the same time was studying at the philological faculty of the Karelian University. Since the first days of the German invasion of the Soviet Union, he was an intelligence operator at the front. He was killed on August 5, 1941 near the village Utuki of Kondopoga raion. He was rehabilitated in 1956.

Creative activity

Ales Prudnikau began his creative activity as a school poet together with his cousin Pavel Prudnikau in 1926. The time of his studying coincided with the process of belarusization in BSSR, so it he began to write his verses in Belarusian. At the same time he was an informal correspondent for some newspapers. For example, after a treasure of ancient coins had been found in the village Stary Dzedzin, he wrote a report to the newspaper "Belarusian village" together with Pavel. (For more information, look an article Stary Dzedzin). His first verses were published in 1930. In 1932 he wrote a poem "Stars of the Earth" which was published as a book where he told about buildings of the first five-year plan. Some of his verses were published in the book "With the Blood of the Heart" (1967).

Editions of works

 Пруднікаў, А. Зямныя зоры / Алесь Пруднікаў. - Мн., Дзяржаўнае выдавецтва Беларусі, 1932. (Bel.)
 Крывёю сэрца / укладальнік А. Вялюгін. - Мн., Беларусь, 1967. С. 116-122. (Bel.)

Literature

Беларуская энцыклапедыя: У 18 т. Т. 13. - Мн.: БелЭн, 2001. - С. 48.Беларуская энцыклапедыя: У 18 т. Т. 13: Праміле - Рэлаксін/ Рэдкал.: Г. П. Пашкоў і інш. - Мн.: БелЭн, 2001. - 576 с.: іл. - С. 48.
Беларускія пісьменнікі (1917–1990): Даведнік / Склад. А. К. Гардзінскі; Нав. рэд. А. Л. Верабей. - Мн., Маст. літ., 1994. - С. 441-442.
Маракоў Л. Рэпрэсаваныя літаратары, навукоўцы, работнікі асветы, грамадскія і культурныя дзеячы Беларусі. 1794-1991. Том II. С. 159-160.
Памяць: Гіст.-дакум. хроніка Клімавіцк. р-на. - Мн.: Універсітэцкае, 1995. - 645 с.: іл. - С. 624.
Пруднікаў П. Далёкае, але не забытае: Успаміны. - Мн., Маст. літ., 1988. - 175 с. - С. 149-154.

Notes

External links
Рэпрэсаваныя літаратары, навукоўцы, работнікі асветы, грамадскія і культурныя дзеячы Беларусі. 1794-1991. Том II. ПРУДНІКАЎ Павел Іванавіч
Алесь Пруднікаў. Біяграфія

See also

Pavel Prudnikau

1910 births
1941 deaths
People from Klimavichy District
People from Klimovichskiy Uyezd
Belarusian writers
Belarusian male poets
20th-century Belarusian poets
20th-century male writers
Soviet military personnel killed in World War II
Herzen University alumni